Saklon Amada is a 2010 Indian Meitei language film directed by L. Surjakanta and produced by Guruaribam John Sharma. The movie is a production of Narayan Sharma Films (N.S. Films). Produced with a vision of women empowerment, the film stars Kaiku Rajkumar, Maya Choudhury, Thingom Pritam and Daisy Kh. in the lead roles. The movie was premiered at Shankar Talkies, Lamphel in February 2010. It was later released at Pratap Talkies, Paona Bazar and many other theatres of Manipur.

The film bagged the Best Feature Film Award at the 1st MANIFA 2012 organised by Sahitya Seva Samiti, Kakching.

Synopsis
The film narrates the story of Memthoi who faces continuous harassments from her immoral husband and her mother-in-law. She returns to her parental home and raises her daughter there. Ningthem stands strongly for Memthoi and constantly insist her to start a new life together. She has a soft corner for Ningthem but does not yield to his insistence.

Cast
 Kaiku Rajkumar as Ningthem
 Maya Choudhury as Memthoi
 Thingom Pritam as Nongmaithem Thouba
 Daisy Kh. as Ningthoujam Thadoi
 R.K. Jnaranjan as Ibohal
 R.K. Hemabati as Ningthem's mother
 Longjam Ongbi Lalitabi as Nongmaithem Ongbi Thagoi
 Hidangmayum Guna as Angoujao
 Benu as Soro
 Aaiso as Ningthoujam Kunjakeshore
 Gurumayum Mema as Indu
 L. Indira Devi as Magistrate Judge
 Bhavnaa as Ebema
 Kiran as Khaba
 Imocha Heisnam as College Lecturer
 Surchandra as Atingba
 Ingoba as Dhatu
 Ibomcha as Taichou
 Yaima as Postman
 Mani Sharma as Advocate
 Boicha as Advocate
 Prabat Kumar as Tachou

Soundtrack
Gunindro Khangembam, Ghanashyam and Hamom Berlin wrote the lyrics and Kiran Koijam composed the songs.

Accolades
The movie won two awards out of the 6 nominations at the 1st Sahitya Seva Samiti MANIFA 2012. The two awards are Best Feature Film and Best Story.

References

2010s Meitei-language films
2010 films
Cinema of Manipur